Kent County Cricket Club's 1909 season was the twentieth season in which the county club competed in the County Championship. Kent played 30 first-class cricket matches during the season, losing only two matches overall, and won their second championship title.  They finished clearly ahead of second place Lancashire in the 1909 County Championship with the previous year's winners, Yorkshire, in third place.

Two of the county's players, Arthur Day and Douglas Carr, were selected as Wisden Cricketers of the Year in 1910 as a result of their performances during the season. Carr made his debut in first-class cricket during the season at the age of 37 and played in his only Test match in August.

The championship title was the second of four by Kent during the Golden Age of cricket in the years leading up to the First World War. It followed their first title in 1906, with the nucleus of the side unchanged from then. It was followed by their third title in 1910 and fourth in 1913.

Background
After decades of underachievement, Kent won their first County Championship in 1906, with "the best county side of the year" which "showed the most brilliant form". The re-emergence of strong Kent sides was based on the development of a mix of "gifted" amateurs playing alongside an increasingly strong core of professionals, most of whom were a product of the club's Tonbridge Nursery - its player development centre based at the Angel Ground at Tonbridge. By 1906 professionals were making around 60% of all appearances for Kent, a figure which had increased markedly since the establishment of the Nursery in 1897 and provided a much firmer foundation for the side to achieve success on the field.

After the success of 1906, Kent finished eighth in the County Championship in 1907 and second in 1908, winning more games than the champions Yorkshire but losing three compared to Yorkshire's unbeaten season. C. H. B. Marsham, who had captained the side in 1906, gave up the captaincy at the end of 1908 and Ted Dillon was appointed to lead the side.

1909 season
Kent started the season with a match against the MCC at Lord's which they won by 97 runs before the County Championship got under way with six away matches. The series of games saw four wins and two draws, with the first three matches of the season won by an innings in each case. A match against Oxford University divided this series of Championship matches and was also won by the margin of an innings.

A draw against Essex in Kent's first home match of the season in June at Catford was followed by two losses to Worcestershire and Lancashire, both matches taking place at Tonbridge. These were to be the only two losses of the Championship season as Kent went unbeaten for the remainder of the season.

Seven wins and a draw from the middle of June to the end of July saw Kent in a commanding position in the Championship. These included an innings victory against Gloucestershire at Catford which saw Kent score 593, the second highest total in the Championship in 1909. They were to continue their good form in August, winning their first two matches of the month during Canterbury Cricket Week and going on to draw three and win three of the remaining Championship matches, including a rain affected draw against third placed Yorkshire at Dover. A match against the touring Australian side at Canterbury in the middle of the month was also a rain affected draw.

A draw, despite being asked to follow-on in a rain shortened match, in the Champion County match in September at The Oval completed the season.

Players

The 1909 side was captained by Ted Dillon in his first year of captaincy and featured England international players Colin Blythe, Kenneth Hutchings and Arthur Fielder. All three had toured Australia over the 1907–08 winter. Frank Woolley made his Test debut during the summer against the touring Australians, the first of his 64 Tests, with Douglas Carr making his sole Test appearance in the same match.

Carr, who bowled leg-spin and who was an early proponent of the relatively new googly delivery, made his first-class cricket debut against Oxford University in May at the age of 37. He had not previously played any first-class cricket but, after developing his googly in 1908, he used it so well in club cricket that Kent offered him a trial. He had played only six first-class matches when he was selected for the fifth Test of the summer's Ashes series, taking five wickets in the first Australian innings and seven overall in the match.

Carr capped his remarkable rise to fame by being selected as one of Wisden's five Cricketers of the Year in 1910 alongside batsman Arthur Day. He played only one Test, although he made regular appearances for Kent until the end of the 1913 season.

Dillon was unavailable from early August and Jack Mason, who had been club captain between 1897 and 1902, stepped in to captain the side in the last five Championship matches. The 1909 side also included Woolley, by now a well established all-rounder, and James Seymour who each played in 29 of the 30 matches in the season as well as Punter Humphreys, Bill Fairservice, Fred Huish and Wally Hardinge, all six of whom were professionals and provided the core of the Kent team for the season. Huish was the main wicket-keeper and was considered the senior professional, beginning a streak of 151 consecutive County Championship appearances in 1909. The reserve wicket-keeper was Jack Hubble who, as a result of Huish's dominant position, played only two matches in 1909.

As well as Carr, batsmen David Jennings and Harold Prest made their debuts for Kent in 1909, Jennings playing once and Prest four times.

Ages given as of the first day of Kent's 1909 County Championship season, 17 May 1909.

Source: CricketArchive and CricInfo statistics

Statistics

During 1909 Kent played 30 first-class matches, including 26 in the County Championship. They won 18, drew ten and lost only two matches, both during Tonbridge week in June.

Punter Humphreys led the county in run scoring with a total of 1,390 runs, including 1,207 in the County Championship, closely followed by Kenneth Hutchings with 1,368 total runs. Hutchings led the Championship aggregate for Kent with 1,251 runs. Frank Woolley, James Seymour and Arthur Day also scored more than 1,000 runs for Kent during the season. Day and Hutchings both scored three centuries, as did Jack Mason who averaged 65.25 with the bat in 14 innings. Humphreys scored the County's highest score of the season with 208, at the time a record highest individual score for Kent.

Woolley and Arthur Fielder shared a partnership of 235 for the tenth wicket against Worcestershire at Amblecote. As of April 2016 this remains the highest last-wicket partnership in the County Championship. The pair came together when Kent were still 40 behind Worcestershire's first innings of 360 and raised Kent's total to 555 before Kent went on to win by an innings. Woolley, who scored 185, had retired hurt earlier in the innings after being hit in the mouth by a ball from Ted Arnold. Fielder contributed 112 not out to the partnership, the only first-class century of his career.

Colin Blythe was Kent's leading wicket taker in 1909, taking 178 Championship wickets at an average of 14.07, a total which led all bowlers in the Championship. He took 185 wickets in total during the season for Kent, including taking 10 wickets in a match five times and five wickets in an innings 18 times during the season with his left arm spin bowling. Fast bowler Arthur Fielder took 95 wickets with spinners Woolley, Douglas Carr and Bill Fairservice all making significant contributions.

Kent's best individual bowling figures for the season were Blythe's 9/42 taken against Leicestershire in May, closely followed by the same bowler's 9/44 against Northamptonshire in the same month. His 16/102 in the match against Leicestershire were the season's best bowling figures in the County Championship, followed by his 14/75 in the match against Northamptonshire.

Fred Huish took 63 wicket-keeping dismissals for Kent during the season, including 35 catches and 22 stumpings in the County Championship. James Seymour took 35 catches in the Championship as part of Kent's well respected slip cordon. Seymour played in every Championship match for Kent during the season, with Blythe, Humphreys, Hutchings and Woolley all playing in 25.

Batting statistics
The table below includes all first-class batting for Kent during the 1909 season.

Source: CricketArchive statistics and scorecards.

Bowling statistics
The table below includes all first-class bowling for Kent during the 1909 season.

Source: CricketArchive statistics and scorecards.

See also
1909 English cricket season
List of Kent County Cricket Club seasons

References

External links
Kent County Cricket Club

1909
1909 in English cricket